Charles William Saalburg (1865–1947) was an American cartoonist and illustrator who lived in San Francisco, and whose work appeared in the San Francisco Wasp and Examiner, the New York World, as well as periodicals in Paris and London. In 1894 he created The Ting Ling Kids comic strip for the Chicago Inter Ocean, which is typically considered the earliest regular American newspaper comic strip to be printed in color. As chief of the Worlds color department, he is also credited with giving the bright yellow color to R. F. Outcault's famous character the Yellow Kid:  when in 1895 he used the Kid's characteristic oversized shirt to test a new, quick-drying yellow ink.
The Yellow Kid, originally drawn with a blue shirt or in black and white, would give rise to the term "yellow journalism".

References

External links

1865 births
1947 deaths
American cartoonists
Artists from San Francisco